Pedigree Petfoods is a subsidiary of the American group Mars, Incorporated specializing in pet food, with factories in England at Melton Mowbray and Birstall, Leeds; and offices at McLean, Virginia.

History
In 1934, Mars Limited, a division of the large American confectionery company, that had been based in Slough since 1932, acquired Chappel Brothers in Manchester. This company took low-quality meat and canned it as dog food, branded as "Chappie".

In 1951, annual sales reached £1m, and the company moved to Melton Mowbray, using a former sewing-thread mill previously used by Patons and Baldwins. In 1953, the company operated seven days a week, 24 hours a day on a shift system. A continuous sterilisation process was introduced instead of batch processing.

New dog food brands Pal and Lassie were introduced during the 1950s. Due to making more than the Chappie product, the company name changed to Petfoods Ltd in 1956. In 1972, this became Pedigree Petfoods Ltd.

A new factory on Shrewsbury Avenue in Woodston, Peterborough opened in October 1974 which originally produced semi-moist products such as Bounce. In March 1975, it became the Pedigree Petfoods division of Mars Ltd.

During the 1970s, around 2,500 workers were at Melton and 200 at Peterborough and produced around 400,000 tonnes of animal food a year and virtually doubled production. The raw materials came from the Oakleigh Manufacturing company in Ascot. Around 3 million cans were used per day at the Melton plant; cans were delivered every 30 minutes, to limit storage space, from the Metal Box company (which became Novar plc). At this time, Whiskas was the company's biggest product by sales closely followed by Pedigree Chum, although more in volume was sold of Pedigree Chum. Whiskas sold four times as much as Kitekat, although only half as much was spent on advertising Kitekat as Whiskas.

Towards the late 1980s and in the 1990s, the company came under much more competition from what became Nestlé Purina PetCare.

A new £22m pouch production line opened in November 2007.

The company is a member of the Pet Food Manufacturers' Association.

A second new additional pouch production line began construction in 2020, opening 2021.

Mars Inc.
In 1968, Mars took over Kal Kan Foods of Los Angeles.

In 1988, Kal Kan Foods changed the name of its dog food to Pedigree, the name Mars used to sell dog food outside the United States. The next year, Mars applied their worldwide branding of Whiskas to their cat food branding.

In 1998, Kal Kan was the top-selling dog food brand but was going downhill. In the United States, its Pedigree Select brand became Cesar, used in Europe and Asia.

Pedigree is now a subsidiary of Mars, Incorporated. The English division of Mars Inc. has been called Masterfoods since January 2002, until it was split into four separate entities in 2007: Mars Petcare UK, Mars Complementary Petcare UK, Mars Chocolate UK and Mars Food UK.

Marketing

The company makes the market leaders Pedigree (dog food) and Whiskas (cat food), as well as Pal (dog food) and Kit-E-Kat (cat food). The slogan used for many years for Pedigree dog food was "Top breeders recommend it because it's solid nourishment" with a current slogan of "We're for dogs". For Whiskas, the old slogan was "Eight out of 10 owners say their cat prefers it" and for Pal, it was "Prolongs Active Life".

In Australia, the Pal dog food brand was progressively replaced by the Pedigree logo during the 1980s-2000s.

In the United States, the original slogan for the Pedigree brand was "Recommended by top breeders". It was replaced in 2007 by "Dogs rule".

The Pedigree Foundation
In the United States, The Pedigree Foundation is a philanthropic organization dedicated to helping shelter dogs find permanent homes. The foundation, created in 2008, provides grants to 501(c)(3) dog shelters and breed rescue organizations, and help dog lovers adopt, volunteer, and make donations. According to the foundation's FAQ site, it has raised more than $4 million to date. In 2008, it distributed more than $1.1 million in grant money to more than 500 shelters and breed rescues. Use of awarded grant money by qualified recipients is virtually unrestricted, but is most often used for shelter improvements or veterinary care.

See also

 Whiskas
 Mars, Incorporated

References

External links
 Pedigree Petfoods UK
 Mars UK
 Pedigree main site
 Pedigree India

Cat food brands
Dog food brands
Mars brands
Companies based in McLean, Virginia
1968 mergers and acquisitions